Rudolph George (born 8 June 1957) is a Sierra Leonean sprinter. He competed in the men's 100 metres, 200 metres and 4 × 100 metres relay at the 1980 Summer Olympics, and was eliminated in the first round in each event.

References

External links
 

1957 births
Living people
Athletes (track and field) at the 1980 Summer Olympics
Sierra Leonean male sprinters
Olympic athletes of Sierra Leone
Sierra Leone Creole people
Place of birth missing (living people)